Events from the year 1882 in Sweden

Incumbents
 Monarch – Oscar II
 Prime Minister – Arvid Posse

Events

 Foundation of the Gefle IF.
 The Salvation Army is introduced in Sweden by Hanna Ouchterlony.
 Closure of the Rossander Course.

Births

 7 January – Humbert Lundén, sailor (died 1961).
 16 May – Elin Wägner, writer, journalist, feminist, teacher, ecologist and pacifist: member of the Swedish Academy (died 1949).
 25 May – Filip Ericsson, sailor (died 1951).
 9 July – Gustaf Kilman, horse rider (died 1946).
 17 July – Oswald Holmberg, gymnast (died 1969).
 14 August – Elin Brandell, journalist (died 1963). 
 2 September – Paul Isberg, sailor (died 1953). 
 12 September – Sven Forssman, gymnast (died 1919).
 11 November – Gustaf VI Adolf, king (died 1973).

Deaths

 1 April - Betty Deland, actress (born 1831)
 11 November  – Charlotta Almlöf, actress  (died 1813)
 - Malla Höök, actress and courtesan (born 1811)
 - Anna Elisabeth Hartwick, lace industrialist (born 1796)

References

 
Years of the 19th century in Sweden